The 10th Zee Cine Awards ceremony honoring the winners and nominees of the best of Bollywood cinema films released in 2006. The ceremony was held on 1 April 2007 at Genting Highlands in Malaysia.

Kabhi Alvida Naa Kehna led the ceremony with 25 nominations, followed by Rang De Basanti with 22 nominations, Omkara with 16 nominations and Krrish with 14 nominations.

Rang De Basanti won 7 awards, including Best Film and Best Director (for Rakeysh Omprakash Mehra), thus becoming the most-awarded film at the ceremony.

Awards 
The winners and nominees have been listed below. Winners are listed first, highlighted in boldface, and indicated with a double dagger.

Popular Awards

Technical Awards

Critics' Awards

Special Awards

Superlatives

References

External links
 Official site

Zee Cine Awards
2007 Indian film awards